Frédéric Dupré (born 12 May 1979) is a Belgian football defender who last played for Herleving Sinaai.
He played as a defender.

He started to play on his six years at Destelbergen FC. Four years later, he went to the youth teams of AA Gent. He was regularly selected in the national youth teams. In the season 1997/98, he was a part of the selection of AA Gent on his 18 years. This team rented him the next season to KSV Oudenaarde, the team in which he became the top scorer. The team promoted to Fourth Division after winning the final round. After this, he returned to Gent, and under the presidency of Trönd Sollied, he played eight times in the 1999/00-season.

When he was 21, Dupré played at SV Roeselare. The next season, he played at KVV Heusden-Zolder. In 2002, he was transferred for four years to SV Zulte-Waregem. In this team, he was champion in Second Division and he won the national Belgian Cup. He managed to get a transfer to Standard de Liège. Over there, he played a cup final (which was lost against Club Bruges) and he was national champion again. As from 2008, he played at Sporting Lokeren. On 23 October 2009, he was suspended by the team management, after a paper interview in which he accused the team management to be unprofessional. he had a contract in Lokeren until 2011, but this was terminated at the end of December 2010 after an injury. In his entire career, he was a two-times Red Devil.

Career

Golden Stud
January 2006, Dupré was selected in Humo's Gouden Stud (election of the most sexy soccer player in First Division). He finished second, after Jamaique Vandamme.

Honours
Zulte Waregem
Belgian Cup: 2005–06

References

External links
Club bio
Frédéric Dupré at Voetbaluitslagen

1979 births
Living people
Belgian footballers
K.A.A. Gent players
K.S.V. Roeselare players
S.V. Zulte Waregem players
Standard Liège players
K.S.C. Lokeren Oost-Vlaanderen players
Belgian Pro League players
Challenger Pro League players
Footballers from Ghent
Association football defenders